Stephen Dodds may refer to:

 Stephen Roxby Dodds (1881–1943), English lawyer and politician
 Stephen Hatfield Dodds, Australian philosophical economist